Heather Deen Locklear (born September 25, 1961) is an American actress famous for her role as Amanda Woodward on Melrose Place (1993–1999), for which she received four consecutive Golden Globe nominations for Best Actress – Television Series Drama. She is also known for her role as Sammy Jo Carrington on Dynasty from 1981 to 1989, her first major television role, which began a longtime collaboration with producer Aaron Spelling. 

Other notable television roles include Officer Stacy Sheridan on T. J. Hooker (1982–1986) and Caitlin Moore on Spin City (1999–2002), for which she earned two more Golden Globe nominations, this time for Best Actress – Television Series Musical or Comedy. She had a recurring role on the TV Land sitcom Hot in Cleveland and a main role on the TNT drama-comedy television series Franklin & Bash in 2013. Her film roles include the science-fiction thriller Firestarter (1984), the action comedy Money Talks (1997), the live-action/animated comedy Looney Tunes: Back in Action (2003) and the romantic comedy The Perfect Man (2005).

Early life
Heather Deen Locklear was born on September 25, 1961, in Los Angeles, California, the daughter of Diane (née Tinsley), a production executive and Bill Locklear, a UCLA administrator and former Colonel in the United States Marine Corps. She has Lumbee ancestry. Locklear attended UCLA, and pledged Chi Omega and Delta Delta Delta, but was never initiated into either sorority.

Career
While at UCLA, she began modeling and working in commercials for the school store. She made her earliest screen appearances in the early 1980s with small roles in episodes of CHiPs, 240-Robert and Eight Is Enough, before beginning a long-term collaboration with Aaron Spelling. Spelling cast her in the role of Sammy Jo Dean during season 2 of his TV series Dynasty, and the following year, he cast her in the cop show T.J. Hooker with William Shatner. Until the mid-1980s, Locklear appeared as a series regular on T.J. Hooker, while making semi-regular appearances on Dynasty. After T.J. Hooker ended in 1986, she became a full-time cast member on Dynasty until its cancellation in 1989. In 1991, the cast of Dynasty (including Locklear) reconvened for the four-hour miniseries Dynasty: The Reunion.

Following Dynasty, Locklear appeared as Drew Barrymore's mother in Firestarter (1984) and had a starring role in the 1989 movie The Return of Swamp Thing (for which she won the satirical Razzie Award for Worst Actress); she also starred in the short-lived sitcom Going Places.

In 1993, she began playing another of her best-known roles, Amanda Woodward, on Aaron Spelling's drama series Melrose Place, which was a spin-off of Beverly Hills, 90210. Spelling originally signed Locklear for a limited four-episode run, the first of which aired on January 27, 1993. Locklear became a full-time cast member (though she continued to be billed as "Special Guest Star" in the opening credits) until its cancellation in 1999. Throughout her career, Locklear has appeared in eight television productions made by Aaron Spelling: Dynasty, T. J. Hooker, Matt Houston, Fantasy Island, The Love Boat, Hotel, Melrose Place, and the made-for-TV movie Rich Men, Single Women.

Locklear was the guest host on Saturday Night Live on May 14, 1994. Two of her best-known skits included her as an elderly Jewish woman on Coffee Talk with Mike Myers and her acting as Amanda Woodward in a Wayne's World skit with Myers, Chris Farley, Adam Sandler, Rob Schneider and Phil Hartman, wherein Wayne has a dream that he is a character on Melrose Place. Locklear also made a cameo in Wayne's World 2 in 1993. In 1996, she appeared as the main guest on Muppets Tonight, performing in a spoof of Melrose Place titled "Muppet Heights". She was also the subject of a Lifetime Intimate Portrait special in 1997, and of an E! True Hollywood Story special in 2004.

Locklear was featured on the cover of Rolling Stone magazine on May 19, 1994, as Melrose Place reached the height of its popularity. She was named one of People Magazine's 50 Most Beautiful People twice, first in 1994, and again in 2001.

After Melrose Place ended in 1999, Locklear was cast in the sitcom Spin City (initially opposite Michael J. Fox and later opposite Charlie Sheen). Locklear earned two Golden Globe Award nominations for Best Actress in a Television Series – Comedy before the series ended in 2002. In 2002, Locklear had a brief recurring role on the sitcom Scrubs. In 2003, she starred in a pilot for her own comedy series, Once Around the Park, but this was unsuccessful. The same year, Locklear appeared in the theatrical film Uptown Girls. In 2004, Locklear made a guest appearance on the sitcom Two and a Half Men, which starred her former Spin City co-star Charlie Sheen. She then starred in the short-lived television drama series LAX set in the airport of the same name. She was also executive producer on the series, but it was cancelled after 11 episodes. In 2005, Locklear appeared in the theatrical film The Perfect Man with Hilary Duff. The same year, she had a brief recurring role on the series Boston Legal, which starred her former T. J. Hooker co-star William Shatner. She was also featured in a Biography Channel special. In 2006, Locklear starred in another television pilot, Women of a Certain Age, but this was unsuccessful. She appeared in the music video for country singer Toby Keith's single "Crash Here Tonight" that same year.

In 2007, Locklear made another pilot for ABC, See Jayne Run, about a business woman who juggles a career with single motherhood, but this was also unsuccessful. She guest-starred on the series Hannah Montana and in the sitcom Rules of Engagement, and was placed 25th on TV Guide and Entertainment Weekly's "100 Greatest TV Icons" list.

In 2009, Locklear joined the cast of The CW's updated version of Melrose Place. Beginning on November 17, 2009, she reprised her role as Amanda Woodward and appeared in eight episodes. Ten years after the end of the original Melrose Place, Amanda Woodward is now a partner in a public relations firm, and is both mentor and tormentor to a young underling, Ella, played by Katie Cassidy. However, despite Locklear's appearances (along with various other original series regulars), the new show was not a ratings success and was cancelled after one season. In 2011, Locklear starred in the television movie He Loves Me on the Lifetime Channel.

In 2012, Locklear began appearing in a recurring role on the TV Land comedy series Hot in Cleveland. In 2013, she became a regular on the comedy-drama Franklin & Bash. In 2014, Locklear featured in a public service announcement titled "We Are, Sarah Jones", in memory of camera assistant Sarah Jones who was killed in an accident on the set of Midnight Rider on February 20, 2014.

In 2016, Locklear appeared in the television movie The Game of Love, which aired on UP on May 15, 2016. Later in 2016, it was revealed that Locklear would be guest-starring in a recurring role in Tyler Perry's drama Too Close to Home on TLC.

Personal life

Relationships

Locklear was married to Mötley Crüe drummer Tommy Lee from May 10, 1986, to 1993. After their divorce, she married Bon Jovi guitarist Richie Sambora, on December 17, 1994, in Paris. She gave birth to their only child, daughter Ava Elizabeth Sambora, on October 4, 1997.  Locklear filed for divorce from Sambora in February 2006. The following month Sambora filed for joint custody of their daughter and enforcement of a prenuptial agreement. Their divorce was finalized in April 2007. In the same month, Locklear began a relationship with fellow Melrose Place alumnus Jack Wagner. In August 2011, Locklear and Wagner announced they were engaged. The couple called off their engagement by that November.

Health and legal troubles
In March 2008, a 9-1-1 call was made by someone who claimed to be Locklear's doctor, who said that Locklear was trying to commit suicide. Emergency responders were dispatched to Locklear's home. Her publicist later said that Locklear had never requested any medical assistance, and the Ventura County Sheriff's Department later stated that no further action was taken once they arrived at Locklear's Westlake Village home, as she appeared to be fine. They did, however, state that they believed the call was genuine.

On June 24, 2008, Locklear checked into a medical facility in Arizona for psychological ailments including anxiety and depression, and requested an in-depth evaluation of her medication to receive proper diagnosis and treatment. Her agent confirmed Locklear was suffering from anxiety and depression. On July 23, 2008, Locklear returned home after four weeks of treatment at the facility.
 
In September 2008, Locklear was pulled over by a California Highway Patrol officer and arrested on suspicion of driving under the influence,  just outside Santa Barbara after she was seen driving erratically. Police had been tipped off about Locklear's driving by Jill Ishkanian, a former reporter and editor at Us Weekly magazine, who saw Locklear outside a market in Montecito, California. Ishkanian photographed the incident and then sold the photos to the celebrity-news website TMZ.com for $27,500, although she claims it was entirely a chance meeting and denies having followed or set up Locklear to obtain photographs. Locklear was formally charged on November 17, 2008, with one misdemeanor count of driving under the influence. A blood test detected no alcohol nor illegal narcotics, but Santa Barbara County Deputy District Attorney Lee Carter stated authorities believe the prescription medications Locklear consumed for her anxiety and depression "could have impaired her ability to safely drive a motor vehicle". On January 2, 2009, Locklear pleaded no contest to reckless driving, and in return the district attorney dismissed the DUI charges. Locklear was sentenced to three years of informal probation, a DMV driver safety class and a $700 fine.

On January 12, 2012, Locklear's sister called 9-1-1 when she believed Locklear was in danger after reportedly taking prescription drugs and alcohol. Emergency personnel responded, and Locklear was taken to Los Robles Hospital in Thousand Oaks, California, but was reported to be out of danger the following day.
 	
In February 2018, Locklear was arrested for domestic violence and battery against a police officer.  She was charged with one felony count of domestic violence and three misdemeanor counts of battery on a police officer.  As deputies arrived at her Thousand Oaks home, she allegedly kicked three of the arresting sheriff deputies and told the deputies she would shoot at them if they ever came into her home again.  According to audio of the 911 call, Locklear's brother called the police after coming to her home, where he found Locklear and her boyfriend arguing. Locklear was released on a $20,000 bond just before 6 a.m. the next day. Locklear's boyfriend, former American Motorcycle Association motocross racer Chris Heisser, was arrested on a driving under the influence charge in Thousand Oaks, hours after Locklear had been taken into custody. After obtaining a warrant, police searched her home for a weapon on March 12 but found none.

On June 24, 2018, Locklear was arrested again, this time for two misdemeanor counts of battery. On June 25, 2018, after being released on bail for charges of battery, Locklear was hospitalized in a suspected case of overdose. In August 2019, she pleaded no contest to charges stemming from that arrest and was sentenced to 30 days in a residential mental health facility.

Awards and nominations

Filmography

Television

Film

Producer
 Melrose Place (1997–99) (as co-producer)
 LAX (2004–05)

See also
List of notable Lumbee

References

External links

 

1961 births
Living people
20th-century American actresses
21st-century American actresses
Actresses from Los Angeles
American film actresses
American people of Lumbee descent
American soap opera actresses
American television actresses
People from Westlake Village, California
People convicted of battery
University of California, Los Angeles alumni